The coat of arms that served as the symbol of the Republic of Central Lithuania was established on 12 October 1920 and remained in use until 18 April 1922, when the state ceased to exist.

Design 
The coat of arms was officially defined as an eagle and Pahonia (a knight on a horse) in the escutcheon. It consists of 2 charges set next to each other. On the right is a silver (white) eagle wearinga crown, and on the left, a silver (white) Pahonia, a charge, that consists of a knight with a sword in his right hand, and a shield with the Cross of Lorraine in his left hand, that is sitting on a jumping horse. Both charges are placed within the red escutcheon with a silver (white) edge.
 Its design referred to the coat of arms used by the Polish National Government during the November Uprising, in 1831.

History 
The coat of arms was established as the symbol of the state, on 12 November 1920, in the Decree No. 1 of the Chief-in-command of the Army of Central Lithuania. The coat of arms stopped being used after the Republic of Central Lithuania was incorporated into Poland on 18 April 1922.

Gallery

See also 
 flag of Central Lithuania
 coat of arms of the Podlaskie Voivodeship

References 

Republic of Central Lithuania
Central Lithuania
Central Lithuania
Central Lithuania
Central Lithuania
Central Lithuania
Central Lithuania
Central Lithuania, Republic
Central Lithuania, Republic
Central Lithuania, Republic
Central Lithuania
1920 establishments in Poland
1920 establishments in Lithuania
1920 establishments in Belarus
1922 disestablishments in Poland
1922 disestablishments in Lithuania
1922 disestablishments in Belarus